Lake Kuremaa is a  lake in Jõgeva Parish, Jõgeva County, Estonia, located  north of Palamuse. It's the 11th largest lake in Estonia and the second largest in the Vooremaa region (after Saadjärv).

References

Lakes of Estonia
Jõgeva Parish
Lakes of Jõgeva County